Bures-sur-Yvette (literally Bures on Yvette) is a commune in the Essonne department in Île-de-France in northern France.

Geography
Bures-sur-Yvette is located in the Vallée de Chevreuse on the river Yvette, along which the RER line B is laid. The stations on the line serving the commune are Bures-sur-Yvette and La Hacquinière. Adjacent communes are Orsay, Gif-sur-Yvette, Gometz-le-Châtel, and Les Ulis. The small town is also twinned with Crewkerne UK.

Population
Inhabitants of Bures-sur-Yvette are known as Buressois in French.

Research
Bures-sur-Yvette hosts the greater part of the Orsay campus of the University of Paris-Sud (Paris XI), as well as the Institut des Hautes Études Scientifiques (IHÉS).

See also
Communes of the Essonne department

References

External links
 Bures-sur-Yvette city council website (in French)

Mayors of Essonne Association 

Communes of Essonne